Frida Sofía Moctezuma Guzmán-Pinal (born March 13, 1992), commonly known as Frida Sofía, is a Mexican-born American singer-songwriter, musician, fashion model, entrepreneur, women's rights activist, brand designer and television presenter; initially, widely referred to as "La Loca Inteligente", she rose to prominence as a fashion model & media personality before launching a musical career as a solo performer. Sofía possesses a lyric soprano vocal range. According to U.S Billboard magazine, Sofía made her musical solo debut on international television in 2019, as the main act during the Gala Anual de la Entrega del Balón de Oro, held in Los Angeles, California; the sporting event was seen by over 30 million people.

Early life
Frida Sofía was born to Alejandra Guzmán and Pablo Moctezuma in Mexico City, Mexico, on March 13, 1992; she is the granddaughter of Mexican actress Silvia Pinal.

From a young age, she obtained her first acting role in the Mexican drama film La Cumbre de las Águilas in 1993; later, she made her debut as a child model. At the time, Sofía collaborated with her grandmother, actress Silvia Pinal on stage, and with her mother, the Mexican rock singer Alejandra Guzmán on tour.

Career

Move to the United States and Univision debut 

In 2004, after a widely known kidnapping attempt in Mexico city, Sofía moved to the United States to start a professional career.

In 2013, she began working in a number of American television networks including Univision, Estrella TV or Telemundo; Sofía was also cast to host the morning television show ¡Despierta América!. Subsequently, Sofía was hired by Cosmopolitan and Televisa to perform as the official presenter of the Cosmopolitan Summer Splash show, held in Miami Florida.

College degrees and Balón de Oro solo debut

In 2014, she graduated from college with two bachelor's degrees in -Design management- and -International fashion marketing- at the Miami International University of Art & Design.
Furthermore, she obtained the leading role as a presenter in a number of international fashion and musical events including Los Premios Glamour and Los Premios de la Radio in the United States.

In 2019, the Mexican Football Federation and Univision hired Frida Sofía to perform as the main musical act for the Gala Anual de la Entrega del Balón de Oro, held in Los Angeles, California. According to U.S Billboard magazine, the live performance became her international musical solo debut which was seen by 30 million viewers.

Frida Sofía premiered her debut single "Ándale" at the Orpheum Theatre in Downtown Los Angeles. The single, which was produced by the Scottish-Canadian country musician Johnny Reid in Nashville, Tennessee, debuted in the Top 5 in Mexico, and at number 13 on iTunes, selling more than 3 million digital downloads during the first four weeks after its release. On October 24, 2019, she released her next single called "Nada Es Para Tanto", recorded in Nashville, Tennessee, produced by Zach Hall, drummer of the rock band Free Throw. Sofía premiered the single at the Universal Studios, in Orlando Florida.

Inside the modeling industry, Frida Sofía has been working in several fashion events and catwalks, working with designers like :es:Leonardo Rocco. She also played the leading role in a number of music videos for other singers including Larry Hernández.

On the other hand, Sofía was hired in February 2015, to be on the cover of Playboy magazine for LatinAmerica.

In 2021, After the release of her following single, "Chicas Malas", Frida Sofía was nominated for the American Premios Juventud (Juventud Awards). In 2022, it was announced that Sofía will join to the main cast of the Reality Tv series  Rica, Famosa, Latina (Rich, Famous, Latina) in the United States. In 2023, is scheduled for worldwide release the first full-length album by Sofía, in CD, Long Play and Digital format; which will incorporate elements of New Wave music, Electronica, Arena rock and Rhythm and blues.

Personal life
In 2004, Sofía moved to Litchfield County, Connecticut after a kidnapping attempt in Mexico city; soon after, she moved to Miami, Florida to start a professional career in the United States. She has three younger siblings, Natasha, Beatriz and Emiliano Moctezuma. In 2021, Sofía alleged that her grandfather, the venezuelan singer Enrique Guzmán, had molested her as a child. Sofía is also an entrepreneur and startup investor, based in Florida.

Discography

Singles discography

See also 
 List of glamour models
 Feminist Studies

References

External links

1992 births
Living people
Pinal family
Singers from Mexico City
Mexican women singers
Women in Latin music
Hispanic and Latino American women singers
Hispanic and Latino American musicians
Self-taught artists
Feminist musicians
Women human rights activists